Mallawa Arachchige Lincoln Perera (commonly known as Lincoln Perera) (Sinhala:ලින්කන් පෙරේරා) was a former civil servant in Sri Lanka. He was the Chairman of Janatha Estates Development Board and Secretary of the Ministry of Plantation Industries.

Early life and education
Lincoln Perera was educated at Nalanda College, Colombo. While at school he played cricket and was the captain of first XI Nalanda cricket team in 1949. He is also the brother of Cabinet Minister (Minister of Food Protection) Gamini Jayawickrama Perera.

Career
Lincoln was also a leading planter in Sri Lanka  and he was the first Ceylonese to be appointed to Kandapola Estate, one of the biggest tea plantations in Sri Lanka. He was also a member of the Umpires Committee of Board of Control for Cricket in Sri Lanka (BCCSL).

See also

 List of government owned companies in Sri Lanka

References 

 Time to jettison deadwood and get professionals on Board
 Lincoln Perera no more
 Gamini Jayawickrema Perera -cricketer turned politician
 So long Valentine
 Gerry, always went out of his way to help others

Alumni of Nalanda College, Colombo
Sri Lankan Buddhists
Sinhalese civil servants
Sri Lankan planters
2010 deaths